Luis Cabral may refer to:

Luís Cabral, president of Guinea-Bissau and Cape Verde
Luis Cabral (archer), Guamanian archer
Luis Cabral (footballer), Paraguayan footballer
Luis Cabral (economist), Paganelli-Bull Professor of Economics and International Business at New York University's Stern School of Business